Eugen W. Fürstenberger (12 February 1880 – 15 February 1975) was a German gymnast. He competed in the men's individual all-around event at the 1900 Summer Olympics.

References

External links
 

1880 births
1975 deaths
German male artistic gymnasts
Olympic gymnasts of Germany
Gymnasts at the 1900 Summer Olympics
Sportspeople from Bas-Rhin
People from Alsace-Lorraine
German emigrants to the United States
German people of French descent